Lenkunya is a genus of land planarians from Australia.

Description 
Species of the genus Lenkunya are characterized by having body that is broadly convex dorsally and flat ventrally. The creeping sole occupies 70–80% of the body width. The eyes form a single row around the anterior tip, are crowded antero-laterally and continue posteriorly in a staggered row. The parenchymal musculature is strong and includes a ring zone of circulo-oblique fibers. The copulatory apparatus has a well-developed penis papilla and lacks adenodactyls or other accessory glands.

Etymology 
The name Lenkunya comes from an aboriginal word meaning beautiful.

Species 
The genus Lenkunya includes the following species:

References 

Geoplanidae
Rhabditophora genera